Shahrak-e Eslamabad (also Romanized as Shahrak-e Eslāmābād; also known as Eslāmābād) is a village in Mir Shams ol Din Rural District, in the Central District of Tonekabon County, Mazandaran Province, Iran. At the 2006 census, its population was 1,023, in 311 families.

References 

Populated places in Tonekabon County